Guillermo Meza may refer to:

 Guillermo Meza (footballer)
 Guillermo Meza (artist)